Dinglidae is an extinct family of hemipteran insects belonging to the suborder Sternorrhyncha. It does not belong to any of the major living sternorrhynchan subgroups, and is a distinct lineage most closely related to whiteflies. The family contains two genera, both of which are known from the mid-Cretaceous Burmese amber of Myanmar.

References 

Burmese amber
Prehistoric insect families
Sternorrhyncha